Torr a'Chaisteal (or Torr a'Chaisteil) is an Iron Age fort (dun), located about  northeast of the village of Sliddery, on the Isle of Arran in Scotland.

Description
Torr a'Chaisteal is situated on an isolated grassy knoll on the west coast of Arran.

It was a fortified residence, or dun, of a type common across western Scotland in the later Iron Age. A similar structure can be seen at Kilpatrick Dun  to the north. The turf-covered walls are 0.5 metres high and have an average width of 4 metres. The walls are formed of large sandstone boulders, enclosing an area with a diameter of around 7 metres. A short stretch of wall lies beside the dun to the east, while on the landward approach is a substantial earthwork that may have formed an outer defence.

Antiquarian excavations in the 19th century uncovered human and animal bones, shells, the top stone of a quern, and pieces of haematite iron.

References

External links

Archaeological sites in North Ayrshire
Historic Scotland properties in North Ayrshire
Scheduled monuments in Scotland
Isle of Arran
Hill forts in Scotland